Alexander Heron Jr. ( 1818 - April 8, 1865) was a businessman involved in shipping in Philadelphia, Pennsylvania during the mid-19th century.

Formative years
Heron was born in Gosten, County Londonderry, Ireland around 1818. Sometime during his late teens or early 20s, he emigrated from Ireland, and arrived in Philadelphia, Pennsylvania around 1835.

In 1851, he entered into a partnership with William J. Martin, forming Heron & Martin. Their ran a line of vessels between Philadelphia and Mobile, Alabama, Charleston, South Carolina, and Savannah, Georgia, establishing the first line of steamships to the latter two cities. After his company failed, he later became agent of the Ocean Steam Navigation Company, owning several company ships. During the American Civil War (1861-1865), Heron sold three of his ships to the United States Navy, the most prominent of which was the Keystone State.

Death and interment
Heron died on April 8, 1865 at the Continental Hotel in Philadelphia. He was buried in Old Cathedral cemetery in Philadelphia.

Family

Heron's sister, Matilda, became a noted actress.

References

Ship owners
1818 births
1865 deaths
Businesspeople from Philadelphia
19th-century American businesspeople
American businesspeople in shipping